is a Japanese football player who plays for SC Sagamihara.

Club statistics
Updated to 23 February 2018.

References

External links

Profile at Matsumoto Yamaga

1986 births
Living people
Association football people from Ibaraki Prefecture
Japanese footballers
J1 League players
J2 League players
Kashima Antlers players
Fagiano Okayama players
Matsumoto Yamaga FC players
SC Sagamihara players
Association football defenders